Keylon Kincade (born August 20, 1982) is a former American football running back. He was signed as an undrafted free agent with the New York Giants out of Southern Methodist University in 2004. 

Kincade enjoyed an All Conference career at SMU, leading the WAC in yards from scrimmage in 2003, as well as carries in both 2002 and 2003. His 2002 (1,279 yards) and 2003
(1,290 yards) currently rank #3 and #4 for single season totals in school history.

Kincade signed with the Dallas Cowboys in September 2004 and remained with the team until the 2006-2007 season. Kincade spent 2005 with the Cologne Centurions of NFL Europe. In 2006, he appeared in one game for the Cowboys.

He was named the Whataburger Coach of the Week in November 2019 while at Winona High in Winona, Texas. Keylon is married to Nakia Kincade.

References

1982 births
Living people
American football running backs
SMU Mustangs football players
Dallas Cowboys players
Cologne Centurions (NFL Europe) players
Players of American football from Texas
People from Troup, Texas